Death Valley Days is a radio Western in the United States. It was broadcast on the Blue Network/ABC, CBS, and NBC from September 30, 1930, to September 14, 1951. It "was one of radio's earliest and longest lasting programs." Beginning August 10, 1944, the program was called Death Valley Sheriff, and on June 29, 1945, it became simply The Sheriff.

Format

Death Valley Days
Radio's first Western, Death Valley Days "dramatized pioneer life in the United States." The program has been described as "the most successful of [the] early western dramas." It was said to present true stories of the old West, with "CBS [asserting] that because of its reputation for accuracy in broadcasting the dramatic history of the development of the West, Death Valley Days was recommended by teachers to their students wherever it was heard to supplement their studies at school." Radio historian John Dunning commented, "By 1940, the show's reputation for historical accuracy was well-established." That accuracy was attested to by the recognition received by the program. "Death Valley Days won awards from the Governors of California, Nevada, and Utah and historical societies including the Native Daughters of the Golden West, and from the University of Washington."

Each episode began with a bugle call, followed by an announcer's introduction of The Old Ranger ("a composite character who had known the bushwhackers, desperados, and lawmen of the old days by first name"). For nearly six years, the program also included Western songs by John White, known as "The Lonesome Cowboy."

Death Valley Sheriff and The Sheriff
Beginning in 1944, a modernized version of Death Valley Days was presented with the title Death Valley Sheriff, which the following year was changed to simply The Sheriff.  Instead of "The Old Ranger," the host/narrator was Sheriff Mark Chase of Canyon County, California.

Personnel

Host/narrator
As an anthology series, Death Valley Days had no continuing cast of characters other than The Old Ranger, who introduced and narrated each episode. Over the years, The Old Ranger was played by Jack MacBryde, Tim Daniel Frawley, George Rand, and Harry Humphreys. In the later versions (Death Valley Sheriff and The Sheriff) Sheriff Mark Chase was portrayed by Robert Haag, Donald Briggs, and Bob Warren. Announcers were George Hicks, Dresser Dahlstead, and John Reed King.

Creator/writer
Ruth Cornwall Woodman was a writer for McCann Erickson when that advertising agency's executives decided to launch Death Valley Days. As one of the few agency employees who wrote for radio, Woodman was assigned to write the scripts for Death Valley Days. "The program's sponsor, Pacific Coast Borax Company, stipulated that the writer should have a first-hand knowledge of the Death Valley region," so for 14 years Woodman went to Death Valley each summer to gather information that she could use in her scripts. Each summer's trip provided enough material for Woodman to write scripts for the next season of the program. She continued to write for the program after its radio broadcasts ended and the televised version began. A 1962 newspaper article noted, "Mrs. Woodman has written every one of the Death Valley Days scripts for 31 years -- which amounts to more than 1,000 stories."

Sponsors
For most of its time on the air, Death Valley Days was sponsored by the Pacific Borax Company, manufacturer of 20 Mule Team Borax. Dunning wrote: "The show immediately established its ties to the sponsor."  The third episode dealt with finding borax at Furnace Creek, and several episodes dealt with 20-mule teams.

Procter & Gamble and American Chicle Company became sponsors of The Sheriff in 1951.

See also
 Gene Autry's Melody Ranch
 Hopalong Cassidy, radio program
 The Roy Rogers Show, radio program
 Death Valley Days, TV series

References 

Death Valley
Western (genre) radio series
1930 radio programme debuts
1951 radio programme endings
1930s American radio programs
1940s American radio programs
NBC radio programs
NBC Blue Network radio programs
CBS Radio programs
ABC radio programs
Radio programs adapted into television shows
1950s American radio programs
Anthology radio series